Ghadat al-sahara is a 1929 Egyptian film that stars Lebanese actress Mary Queeny in her debut role. It is also the first production of the Lebanese actress Assia Dagher, who also starred in the film.

References

Egyptian black-and-white films
1929 films